Vicky Pope is a scientist and the former head of the climate predictions programme at the Hadley Centre.

Biography 
Pope attended North London Collegiate School. She joined the Met Office in the 1980s and went on to complete a PhD in Meteorology at the University of Reading. 

She spent 6 years as manager of atmospheric climate model development and evaluation. She became a senior manager of the climate research programme for a number of UK Government departments in 2002. Since October 2004 she was Head of the Climate Prediction Programme which provides independent scientific advice on climate change. Her research interests include developing and validating climate models.

She is a professor at Gresham College, and an honorary professor at University College London.

In an article for The Guardian newspaper, she wrote: "Having to rein in extraordinary claims that the latest extreme event is all due to climate change is at best hugely frustrating and at worse enormously distracting. Overplaying natural variations in the weather as climate change is just as much a distortion of science as underplaying them to claim that climate change has stopped or is not happening."

She added: "Both undermine the basic facts that the implications of climate change are profound and will be severe if greenhouse gas emissions are not cut drastically."

Publications 

 
 
 Led the Met Office Hadley Centre contribution of climate science to the Stern review: the Economics of Climate Change.

 http://www.oxonia.org/WE%201-8/WE_1-8_article11.html
 

 Sun and superstorms: Our changing climate. (2016) Chapter for The Earth and I: a book of essays edited by James Lovelock

Selected newspaper and web articles 2007-2013 
Models 'key to climate forecasts'. BBC
Climate change, the real facts, The Sun newspaper
Scientists must rein in misleading claims, Guardian 
Research is robust but communication is weak, The Times  
How science will shape climate adaptation plans, The Guardian 
Are climate data and evidence important? World Bank blog
Brochures on climate science for visitors to the UNFCCC climate conferences and interested stakeholders, 2005-2010

References 

British climatologists
Women climatologists
British women scientists
Living people
Alumni of Girton College, Cambridge
Alumni of the University of Reading
Year of birth missing (living people)